Brian Leonhardt (born April 2, 1990) is a former American football tight end. He is a native of Spring Lake Park, Minnesota. He was signed by the Oakland Raiders as an undrafted free agent in 2013. He played college football at Bemidji State University.

College career
In his Junior season, he was selected for Daktronics All-America Second-team, Super Region #3 First-team and the All-NSIC First-team. He also was D2Football.com All-America Honorable Mention following the season.

Professional career

Oakland Raiders
On April 28, 2013, he signed with the Oakland Raiders as an undrafted free agent.

Cleveland Browns
On July 30, 2015, Leonhardt signed with the Cleveland Browns.

San Francisco 49ers
On November 16, 2015, the San Francisco 49ers signed Leonhardt off of the Browns practice squad, to their own. On December 12, 2015, Leonhardt was promoted to the 49ers' active roster.

Minnesota Vikings
On March 18, 2016, Leonhardt signed with the Minnesota Vikings. He was released on August 29, 2016.

Detroit Lions
On September 3, 2016, Leonhardt was signed to the Detroit Lions' practice squad.  He was released on September 30, 2016.

Second stint with the Vikings
On October 5, 2016, Leonhardt re-signed with the Minnesota Vikings. He was released on October 25, 2016.

Arizona Cardinals
Leonhardt was signed to the Cardinals' practice squad on November 1, 2016.

References

External links
Oakland Raiders bio
San Francisco 49ers bio
Bemidji State Beavers bio

1990 births
Living people
People from Spring Lake Park, Minnesota
Players of American football from Minnesota
American football tight ends
Bemidji State Beavers football players
Oakland Raiders players
Cleveland Browns players
San Francisco 49ers players
Minnesota Vikings players
Detroit Lions players
Arizona Cardinals players
People from Blaine, Minnesota